Steve Yates may refer to:

 Steve Yates (footballer, born 1953)
 Steve Yates (footballer, born 1970)

See also
 Stephen Yates (born 1951), English cricketer
 Steven Yates (born 1983), New Zealand rugby player
 Stephen J. Yates, American politician